Jeff Kromenhoek (born March 14, 1976) is a bobsledder who represented the United States Virgin Islands. He competed in the two man and the four man events at the 1998 Winter Olympics.

References

External links
 

1976 births
Living people
United States Virgin Islands male bobsledders
Olympic bobsledders of the United States Virgin Islands
Bobsledders at the 1998 Winter Olympics
Place of birth missing (living people)